Thomas Kennedy   (25 December 1874 – 3 March 1954) was a British Labour politician.

Biography
Kennedy was born in Kennethmont, Aberdeenshire, and became a railway clerk.  He joined the Social Democratic Federation (SDF) and soon became its organiser for Aberdeen, standing for Parliament in Aberdeen North in the 1906 and January 1910 general elections.  He supported the SDF's formation of the British Socialist Party (BSP) and became its National Organiser in 1913, but in 1914 left to fight in World War I.  As a supporter of the War, he left the BSP in 1916 to join the new National Socialist Party.  He became the editor of the Social Democrat, successor to Justice.

His first wife, Christian Farquharson, whom he married in 1905, was also a socialist, having attended the International Socialist Congress in Paris in 1900.  She died in 1917 and he subsequently remarried.

He was Labour Member of Parliament (MP) for Kirkcaldy Burghs from 1921–1922, from 1923–1931 and from 1935–1944 and also unsuccessfully fought the 1932 Montrose Burghs by-election. He was Scottish Labour Whip in 1921–1922 and from 1923–1925. He served in Government as a Lord Commissioner of the Treasury in 1924, in opposition as Deputy Chief Whip (1925–1927) and Chief Whip of the Labour Party (1927–1931) and again in Government as Parliamentary Secretary to the Treasury from 1929–1931.

He was appointed a Privy Counsellor in the 1931 New Year Honours.

He died on 3 March 1954.

References

External links 
 

1874 births
1954 deaths
People from Aberdeenshire
British Socialist Party members
Social Democratic Federation members
Members of the Privy Council of the United Kingdom
Members of the Parliament of the United Kingdom for Fife constituencies
Scottish Labour MPs
UK MPs 1918–1922
UK MPs 1923–1924
UK MPs 1924–1929
UK MPs 1929–1931
UK MPs 1935–1945